Rice water is a suspension of starch obtained by draining boiled rice or by boiling rice until it completely dissolves into the water.  It may be used as a weak gruel for invalids.  It is especially effective in the treatment of diarrhea such as that arising in cholera or gastroenteritis.

History 
Historically, women in various Asian regions such as China, Japan, and Southeast Asia have applied rice water as a hair treatment for hundreds of years. The use of rice water has dated back to the Heian period (794CE to 1185CE) in Japan. Japanese women during this time period were known to have floor-length hair kept healthy by bathing it in rice water.

Today, a group known as the Yao people reside primarily in Huangluo, which is a village in China. The Yao women are famous for their extremely long hair, averaging about 6 feet in length. Not only is their hair long, but it is said that it takes much longer for a Yao woman's hair to lose its color and begin to turn gray; apparently it is only when they reach their 80s that they begin to experience hair color changes. The Yao women attribute their long and healthy hair to bathing and soaking it in rice water.

See also

 Rice milk
 Congee
 Barley water
 List of rice beverages

References

Rice drinks